The Employment Protection (Consolidation) Act 1978 was a UK Act of Parliament that formed a central part of UK labour law. Its descendant is the Employment Rights Act 1996. It consolidated two pieces of legislation, the Contracts of Employment Act 1963 and the Redundancy Payments Act 1965.

See also
UK labour law

External links
Text of remainder of statute from Opsi
Text of repeals and remainders from statutelaw.gov

United Kingdom labour law
United Kingdom Acts of Parliament 1978
1978 in labor relations